Diāna Bukājeva (born 16 September 1991 in Riga) is a former Latvian tennis player.

Bukājeva holds a win–loss record of 5–0 for Latvia in Fed Cup competition, having represented her country in 2007 and 2008 in Mauritius and Armenia respectively. Her latter appearances helped the team get promoted to Group II of the 2009 Fed Cup Europe/Africa Zone.

Fed Cup participation

Singles

Doubles

References

External links 
 
 

1991 births
Living people
Sportspeople from Riga
Latvian female tennis players
Stetson University alumni